China: Time of Xi is a documentary television series that aired on Discovery Asia television stations in the United States. Airing over 3 consecutive days, the documentary television series gets under the skin of Xi Jinping, General Secretary of the Communist Party of China, to discover what's happening in China, what China's unique experience could offer the world, and what drivers Xi Jinping himself.  China: Time of Xi was hosted by Danny Forster, DR. Jordan Nguyen and Mary-Ann Ochota.

Synopsis

References

Cultural depictions of Xi Jinping
2017 American television series debuts
2010s American documentary television series
English-language television shows